First Presbyterian Church (also known as Christian Science Society) is a historic church building at 101 E. Washington Avenue in McAlester, Oklahoma. It was built in 1895 and added to the National Register of Historic Places in 1979.

It is a one-story , cream-colored, shingle-style Presbyterian church.

References

Presbyterian churches in Oklahoma
Churches on the National Register of Historic Places in Oklahoma
Shingle Style architecture in Oklahoma
Churches completed in 1895
Buildings and structures in Pittsburg County, Oklahoma
National Register of Historic Places in Pittsburg County, Oklahoma